Chris Tarrant (born 18 September 1980) is a former Australian rules footballer who played for the Collingwood Football Club and the Fremantle Football Club in the Australian Football League (AFL). He announced at the end of the 2010 AFL season that he would return to Melbourne for personal reasons and would not extend his contract with Fremantle for the 2011 season. He returned to the Collingwood Football Club via a trade. He made his name as a key forward, but upon his move to Fremantle in 2007, Tarrant found a new position in the backline. Tarrant was noted for his spectacular high marking, athleticism and pace on a lead.

Early life 
Born in Derrimut, Victoria, Tarrant originally played for South Mildura in the Sunraysia Football League and moved to Bendigo in 1996 on an AFL scholarship.

In his younger days he was a top basketballer, making the Victorian State under-15 squad before concentrating on football.

His younger brother Robbie Tarrant plays for the Richmond Football Club.

AFL career

Collingwood  
His 2003 season was his best for Collingwood as he was an All-Australian forward, playing all 22 games plus three finals. He kicked 54 goals and topped Collingwood's goalkicking, and won the 2003 Mark of the Year for his high-flying mark against Geelong.

Despite being hampered by knee problems in 2005, Tarrant kicked 36 goals in 17 games to be Collingwood's lead goalkicker for a fifth straight season.

In November 2005, Collingwood coach Mick Malthouse stated that Tarrant had gained strength in his legs after a successful recovery from post-season knee surgery. A big 2006 season was predicted from the enigmatic Tarrant, however this did not eventuate.

Honours bestowed upon Tarrant during his AFL career include All Australian selection in 2003, Second place in the Collingwood Best & Fairest award (Copeland Trophy) in 2003, Club Leading Goalkicker in 2001, 2002 (equal), 2003, 2004, 2005, and Mark Of The Year in 2003.

Fremantle  

On 13 October 2006, the final day of trade week and after being linked with several clubs – primarily the two Western Australian clubs West Coast and Fremantle, Tarrant was traded to the Fremantle Football Club in a deal that saw Paul Medhurst and Draft Selection #8 head to Collingwood.

On being traded to the Dockers, Tarrant said that Subiaco Oval, both Fremantle and the West Coast Eagles' home ground, would suit his style of play. He also thought that playing alongside Matthew Pavlich, a similar styled player, would be difficult for opposition defences. He also looked forward to a chance to play in the same team as his former schoolmate Dean Solomon, who was also traded to Fremantle.

Tarrant was given the number 17 guernsey to wear. He was initially used to work up on the ground and had racked up multiple possessions playing in that role. He has also played as a second string forward in a forward line that depended much on Pavlich.

In 2009, coach Harvey moved Tarrant into defence following some poor form up forward.  The move was successful, with Tarrant putting together a string of noteworthy defensive performances on opposition forwards as well as providing some penetrating rebound attack.

Return to Collingwood 
On 11 October 2010, the final day of the trade period, Tarrant returned to Collingwood in a trade that saw him and pick 44 traded to Collingwood for picks 43 and 55. He was given the Number 2 guernsey and continued to play as a back and full-back as he had at Fremantle.

Tarrant announced his retirement on 21 August 2012, effective from the end of the 2012 season.

Statistics

|-
|- style="background-color: #EAEAEA"
! scope="row" style="text-align:center" | 1998
|style="text-align:center;"|
| 20 || 11 || 3 || 6 || 39 || 22 || 61 || 19 || 11 || 0.3 || 0.5 || 3.5 || 2.0 || 5.5 || 1.7 || 1.0 || 0
|-
! scope="row" style="text-align:center" | 1999
|style="text-align:center;"|
| 20 || 13 || 15 || 8 || 107 || 80 || 187 || 60 || 16 || 1.2 || 0.6 || 8.2 || 6.2 || 14.4 || 4.6 || 1.2 || 0
|- style="background-color: #EAEAEA"
! scope="row" style="text-align:center" | 2000
|style="text-align:center;"|
| 20 || 19 || 28 || 13 || 172 || 82 || 254 || 121 || 20 || 1.5 || 0.7 || 9.1 || 4.3 || 13.4 || 6.4 || 1.1 || 0
|-
! scope="row" style="text-align:center" | 2001
|style="text-align:center;"|
| 20 || 22 || 53 || 29 || 214 || 44 || 258 || 139 || 24 || 2.4 || 1.3 || 9.7 || 2.0 || 11.7 || 6.3 || 1.1 || 6
|- style="background-color: #EAEAEA"
! scope="row" style="text-align:center" | 2002
|style="text-align:center;"|
| 20 || 20 || 38 || 31 || 159 || 68 || 227 || 98 || 29 || 1.9 || 1.6 || 8.0 || 3.4 || 11.4 || 4.9 || 1.5 || 4
|-
! scope="row" style="text-align:center" | 2003
|style="text-align:center;"|
| 20 || 25 || 54 || 44 || 301 || 74 || 375 || 219 || 38 || 2.2 || 1.8 || 12.0 || 3.0 || 15.0 || 8.8 || 1.5 || 12
|- style="background-color: #EAEAEA"
! scope="row" style="text-align:center" | 2004
|style="text-align:center;"|
| 20 || 14 || 36 || 30 || 144 || 37 || 181 || 109 || 17 || 2.6 || 2.1 || 10.3 || 2.6 || 12.9 || 7.8 || 1.2 || 3
|-
! scope="row" style="text-align:center" | 2005
|style="text-align:center;"|
| 20 || 17 || 36 || 27 || 133 || 49 || 182 || 93 || 28 || 2.1 || 1.6 || 7.8 || 2.9 || 10.7 || 5.5 || 1.6 || 1
|- style="background-color: #EAEAEA"
! scope="row" style="text-align:center" | 2006
|style="text-align:center;"|
| 20 || 20 || 36 || 31 || 195 || 84 || 279 || 151 || 39 || 1.8 || 1.5 || 9.8 || 4.2 || 14.0 || 7.6 || 2.9 || 2
|-
! scope="row" style="text-align:center" | 2007
|style="text-align:center;"|
| 17 || 21 || 33 || 27 || 203 || 88 || 291 || 134 || 34 || 1.6 || 1.3 || 9.7 || 4.2 || 13.9 || 6.4 || 1.6 || 0
|- style="background-color: #EAEAEA"
! scope="row" style="text-align:center" | 2008
|style="text-align:center;"|
| 20 || 16 || 23 || 14 || 146 || 68 || 214 || 97 || 33 || 1.4 || 0.9 || 9.1 || 4.3 || 13.4 || 6.1 || 2.1 || 0
|-
! scope="row" style="text-align:center" | 2009
|style="text-align:center;"|
| 20 || 22 || 3 || 2 || 142 || 137 || 279 || 87 || 44 || 0.1 || 0.1 || 6.5 || 6.2 || 12.7 || 4.0 || 2.0 || 0
|- style="background-color: #EAEAEA"
! scope="row" style="text-align:center" | 2010
|style="text-align:center;"|
| 20 || 13 || 1 || 1 || 77 || 62 || 139 || 39 || 31 || 0.1 || 0.1 || 5.9 || 4.8 || 10.7 || 3.0 || 2.4 || 0
|-
! scope="row" style="text-align:center" | 2011
|style="text-align:center;"|
| 2 || 23 || 2 || 1 || 103 || 120 || 223 || 71 || 26 || 0.1 || 0.0 || 4.5 || 5.2 || 9.7 || 3.1 || 1.1 || 1
|- style="background-color: #EAEAEA"
! scope="row" style="text-align:center" | 2012
|style="text-align:center;"|
| 2 || 12 || 6 || 5 || 80 || 40 || 120 || 54 || 24 || 0.5 || 0.4 || 6.7 || 3.3 || 10.0 || 4.5 || 2.0 || 0
|- class="sortbottom"
! colspan=3| Career
! 268
! 367
! 269
! 2215
! 1055
! 3270
! 1491
! 414
! 1.4
! 1.0
! 8.3
! 3.9
! 12.2
! 5.6
! 1.5
! 29
|}

Post-AFL career 
Since his retirement, Tarrant has become a "fly-in" footballer, signing to play games with clubs around Australia to boost popularity for the clubs. Tarrant signed on to play one game for the North Launceston Bombers in 2013, kicking seven goals against eventual premiers South Launceston.

Tarrant also made one appearance for the Glenorchy Football Club in 2013 in the TSL.

Tarrant returned to the Bombers in 2014, signing a minimum five game contract, with the option of continuing for finals. He appeared in the qualifying final, kicking five goals to help the Bombers advance to the second semi. During the second semi final, he was reported for striking a Clarence player, but received a reprimand due to his good record. With the Bombers causing an upset, Tarrant lined up in the Tasmanian State League Grand Final.

Off-field incidents
In August 2006, Tarrant and Collingwood teammate Ben Johnson were involved in a fight at a Port Melbourne nightclub.  Johnson was charged with recklessly causing injury and unlawful assault and accepted responsibility for the incident.  Tarrant was not charged, but was fined $5,000 by Collingwood for breaking the players code of conduct.

In June 2007, Tarrant was accused of showing his backside to a female patron of a Darwin nightclub and punching the Federal ALP candidate for Division of Solomon, Damian Hale, after he confronted Tarrant about his behaviour. After the Fremantle Football Club took the unusual step of referring the matter to the AFL to investigate, they fined Tarrant $5,000 and suspended him for three matches, with two matches suspended until the end of 2008.

Career highlights 
2nd Collingwood best and fairest 2003
Collingwood leading goalkicker 2001, 2002 (equal), 2003, 2004, 2005
Anzac Day Medal 2001
All-Australian 2003
AFL Mark of the Year 2003
Jason McCartney Medal 2006

References

External links

1980 births
All-Australians (AFL)
Collingwood Football Club players
East Perth Football Club players
Fremantle Football Club players
North Launceston Football Club players
Living people
People from Mildura
Australian rules footballers from Victoria (Australia)
Bendigo Pioneers players
Glenorchy Football Club players